Eynsham Lock is a lock on the River Thames in England. It is on the southern bank near Swinford Oxfordshire. The large village of Eynsham is a little distance away on the northern bank.

The lock was one of the last pound locks built on the Thames being built by the Thames Conservancy in 1928. 

The weir is on the other side of the island on the original course of the river.

History

There was previously a weir and flash lock known as Eynsham or Bolde's weir, originally owned by Eynsham Abbey. The weir was rebuilt in 1886 after there had been some proposals for removing it and around 1890 a boatslide was built for the portage of small boats. It was replaced by the pound lock in 1928 which was cut across the neck of a bend. The weir was reconstructed in 1950.

Access to the lock
The lock is close to the B4044 road where it crosses the river at Swinford Toll Bridge and is accessible on foot.
There is a permissive path across the lock and weir.

Reach above the lock

A short distance upstream of the lock is Swinford Toll Bridge. After the bridge there used to be a very sharp horseshoe bend which gave problems to navigation until a cut was built across it in 1900. The river continues to head south west through predominantly open country. The only interruption is a large marina on the eastern bank.

The Thames Path follows the southern bank to Pinkhill Lock.

See also 

 Locks on the River Thames

External links 
 Eynsham Lock illustrated feature at Eynsham Online
 A History of The River Thames at Eynsham extract from The Eynsham Record
 Eynsham Lock archived from eynsham.org

References

Locks on the River Thames
Locks of Oxfordshire